Cilazapril is an angiotensin-converting enzyme inhibitor (ACE inhibitor) used for the treatment of hypertension and congestive heart failure. 

It was patented in 1982 and approved for medical use in 1990.

Chemistry
Of the eight possible stereoisomers, only the all-(S)-form is medically viable.

Brand names
It is branded as Dynorm, Inhibace, Vascace and many other names in various countries. None of these are available in the United States as of May 2010.

References

ACE inhibitors
Carboxylic acids
Enantiopure drugs
Hoffmann-La Roche brands
Ethyl esters
Lactams
Prodrugs
Nitrogen heterocycles
Heterocyclic compounds with 2 rings
Carboxylate esters